The Rosenjoch is a mountain, and the highest point of the Voldertal and Arztal in the western Tux Alps. The top which bears a summit cross lies on the Inn Valley Mountain Trail (Inntaler Höhenweg) between the Glungezer Hut and Lizumer Hut in the Wattentaler Lizum and is thus frequently climbed in summer. The Rosenjoch may also be reached from the Voldertal Hut.

In late winter and early spring the Rosenjoch is popular with skiers. Nevertheless, its ascent requires safe conditions.

External links

Mountains of the Alps
Two-thousanders of Austria
Mountains of Tyrol (state)
Tux Alps